Eleme, also known as Elémé, is a town at  in northern Kayes Region, Mali, north of Sambanara.

Populated places in Kayes Region